Champagne crayeuse ("chalky Champagne") is a natural region in Grand Est, northeastern France. Its name refers to the chalk subsoil found throughout the region. The main cities in the region are Reims, Châlons-en-Champagne and Troyes.

Geography of Grand Est